Robert Habeck (born 2 September 1969) is a German politician and writer who has been serving as Vice Chancellor of Germany, Federal Minister for Economic Affairs and Climate Action in the cabinet of Chancellor Olaf Scholz and as a Member of the German Bundestag for Flensburg – Schleswig since 2021. From 2018 to 2022, he also served as co-leader of Alliance 90/The Greens, alongside Annalena Baerbock. For the 2021 German federal election, he was a member of the leading duo, alongside Baerbock, who ran for chancellor of Germany.

In 2009, Habeck was voted into the state parliament of Schleswig-Holstein as a deputy of The Greens and became group chairman. Both, at early elections in 2012 and at the federal elections in 2017 he ran as the top candidate of his own party. From 2012 to 2018 he held office as deputy minister-president and minister for energy revolution, agriculture, environment, and nature (since 2017 for digitisation as well) for the cabinet of Albig as well as for the cabinet of Günther. After he was elected federal chairman of his party in 2018, he retired from his function as minister. At the 2021 federal elections, he achieved the direct mandate of his electoral-district Flensburg-Schleswig with 28.1 percent of first votes. Habeck is allocated to the political-realists of the Green Party.

Early life, education and writing 
Habeck passed his final secondary-school examinations in 1989 at the Heinrich Heine School in Heikendorf in the Plön district. After completing his alternative civilian service in 1991 he began studying for a master's degree with a combination of Philosophy, German and Philology at the Albert Ludwigs University in Freiburg im Breisgau. After the intermediate examination in 1992/93 he attended Roskilde University in Denmark. In 1996 Habeck received a master's degree from the University of Hamburg. From 1996 to 1998 he completed a doctorate at the University of Hamburg and was awarded a doctorate in Philosophy in 2000.

From 1999 Habeck and his wife Andrea Paluch worked as freelance writers. In addition to children's books and translations of English poetry, Habeck (with Paluch) published six novels: among others, Hauke Haien's Death (2001), The Day I Met My Dead Man (2005) and Under the Gully lies the sea (2007). Habeck is fluent in Danish.

Political career

Career in state politics 
In 2009, Habeck was elected to the Schleswig-Holstein Landtag via the party list. In November 2011, he was voted as the top candidate of his party for the 2012 Schleswig-Holstein election. From 2009 to 2012, Habeck was chairman of the Alliance 90/The Greens group in Schleswig-Holstein.

Habeck has been Deputy Prime Minister and State Minister for Energy, Agriculture, Environment and Rural Areas in the centre-left Albig Cabinet since 2012 and in the center-right Günther Cabinet between 2017 and 2018. Under his leadership – he was not a candidate for parliament – the Green Party became the third largest group in the Landtag after the 2017 state elections. As one of his state's representatives at the Bundesrat, he served on the Committee on Agricultural Policy and Consumer Protection; the Committee on the Environment, Nature Protection and Reactor Safety; the Committee on Economic Affairs; and the Committee on Transport. From 2014 and 2016, Habeck was one of the members of Germany's temporary National Commission on the Disposal of Radioactive Waste.

Role in federal politics 
Habeck served as a Green Party delegate to the Federal Convention for the purpose of electing the President of Germany in 2012. He ran to become one of the two top candidates for the Greens for the 2017 German federal election, but lost by 75 votes to Cem Özdemir.

On 27 January 2018, the Green Party's national convention in Hanover elected him as chairman, a position shared with Annalena Baerbock.

Habeck was elected to the Bundestag in the 2021 German federal election, defeating the CDU incumbent Petra Nicolaisen in the constituency of Flensburg – Schleswig.

Vice Chancellor and Minister for Economic Affairs 
After the Greens agreed to form a traffic light coalition government with the centre-left Social Democrats and liberal Free Democrats, new Chancellor Olaf Scholz named Habeck as Minister for Economic Affairs and Climate Action and Vice Chancellor in December 2021, making him one of the most powerful politicians in Europe.

Energy policy

In April 2022, Habeck presented a package of measures to speed up Germany's expansion of renewable energy, as the need to reduce the country's heavy reliance on Russian fossil fuels added urgency to its green transition plans; the package envisaged green energy accounting for 80% of the power mix by 2030, up from about 40% in 2022 and a previous target of 65%.

An opponent of nuclear energy, Habeck pushed against efforts at the EU level in 2022 to label nuclear power as a sustainable and green energy source. However, amid the 2022 Russia–European Union gas dispute, he announced plans to keep two of Germany’s three remaining nuclear power stations on standby, beyond a year-end deadline to ditch the fuel, to ensure enough electricity supply through the winter during a gas crunch.

When energy-intensive German industry and German exporters were hit particularly hard by the 2021–present global energy crisis, Habeck presented on 29 September 2022 a €200 billion plan to support industry and households.

On 5 October 2022, Habeck accused the United States and other "friendly" gas supplier nations that they were profiting from the Ukraine war with "astronomical prices". He called for more solidarity by the US to assist energy-pressed allies in Europe.

Foreign investments

Under Habeck's leadership, the ministry stopped Beijing-based Aeonmed Group in April 2022 from purchasing German medical device manufacturer Heyer Medical, based on a government assessment that there were dangers to public safety. In November 2022, he formally blocked Silex, a Swedish subsidiary of China’s Sai Microelectronics, from buying a Elmos Semiconductor plant for €85 million, saying the country had to protect key industries from potential security threats.

Arms exports

In September 2022, Habeck confirmed that Germany approved new arms export deals to Saudi Arabia, despite the ban imposed as a result of the Saudi Arabian–led intervention in Yemen. The biggest importers of German weapons were South Korea, Algeria and Egypt.

Political positions

Domestic policies 
Habeck repeatedly declared himself in favor of evacuating refugees out of the camps on the Greek islands.

In November 2020, Habeck presented a 11-points-action-plan against potential Islamic "Gefährder" – individuals deemed a security risk due to extremist views without necessarily being accused of a crime – which he worked out with Konstantin von Notz and Irene Mihalic, politicians for domestic policy. One topic of this paper is to recruit more staff for the local authorities to make closer surveillance and eventually a more consequent enforcement of prevailing arrest warrants possible. Another aspect of these demands was the prohibition of relevant Salafist associations.

In an interview in 2018 Habeck positioned himself against an ethnic notion of nation, which he clearly differentiated from the notion of constitutive people. Additionally, he warned of uncritically acquiring the demands of identity politics.

After Russia's invasion of Ukraine, Habeck's ministry vetoed extending the life of Germany's remaining nuclear plants, arguing that the costs involved outweighed the benefits. Critics said that nuclear energy was a way to reduce Germany's reliance on Russian gas. Habeck cautioned, "If we do not obtain more gas next winter and if deliveries from Russia were to be cut then we would not have enough gas to heat all our houses and keep all our industry going". On 20 March 2022, he met Qatar's Emir Tamim bin Hamad Al Thani. Habeck said Germany reached a long-term energy partnership with Qatar, one of the world's largest exporters of liquefied natural gas, and added: "Although we might still need Russian gas this year, in the future it won't be so any more. And this is only the start". Habeck said Germany plans to end imports of Russian natural gas by mid-2024. According to Habeck, the planned end of Russian energy imports will permanently raise energy prices for German industry and consumers. In June 2022, Habeck warned that Germany is facing a "more significant" energy crisis than during the 1973 oil crisis.

COVID-19 pandemic 

In an interview with Der Tagesspiegel at the end of May 2020, Habeck argued that the COVID-19 pandemic was "maybe the first time" that health care was more important than the profit motive and economic growth. He added: "The moral is that we have to configure our economy in a way that it supports common interests and that it becomes crisis-proof as well". Part of this was environmental and climate change mitigation, saying: "The time of minor compromises is over. All parties can think much bigger". The money that had been made liquid for the crisis management must also be used to fight the economic crisis as well as the climate crisis. The past idea that a speed-limit on the Autobahn would restrict personal freedom seemed ridiculous after the decisions that had been made concerning the COVID crisis. He stated: "If one acts brave enough, one can broadly anchor the willingness of change. Ambitious politicians have received a second wind".

On May 6, 2021, Habeck demanded the federal government waive patent rights for the COVID-19 vaccine.

Other activities 
 KfW, Ex-Officio Member of the Board of Supervisory Directors (since 2021)
 RAG-Stiftung, Ex-Officio Member of the Board of Trustees (since 2021)

Personal life
Habeck is married with four children. He is a vegetarian.

References

1969 births
Living people
Politicians from Lübeck
Alliance 90/The Greens politicians
Ministers of the Schleswig-Holstein State Government
Members of the Landtag of Schleswig-Holstein
German male writers
Members of the Bundestag 2021–2025
Economy ministers of Germany
Vice-Chancellors of Germany
University of Hamburg alumni
University of Freiburg alumni
Roskilde University alumni
Vegetarian